XPD can mean multiple things:
 XPD, a spy novel by Len Deighton
 the ISO 4217 code for the value of one troy ounce of palladium
 XPD, a name for the ERCC2 protein
 XPD Adventure Race, a multi-day adventure race held annually in Australia
 XPD, Cross Polarization Discrimination, in wave transmission: ratio of the co-polarized average received power to the cross-polarized average received power
 XPD Systems AB, an independent security consultancy and research firm
 X-ray photoelectron diffraction, an analytic method to obtain structural and chemical information from surfaces.
 XPD format, XPD files are DRM files associated with the PlayStation Network Downloader
 , the ISO 639-3 code for the Paredarerme language